The men's doubles of the 2015 Advantage Cars Prague Open tournament was played on clay in Prague, Czech Republic.

Toni Androić and Andrey Kuznetsov were the defending champions, but chose not to participate.

Wesley Koolhof and Matwé Middelkoop won the tournament, defeating Sergey Betov and Mikhail Elgin in the final, 6–4, 3–6, [10–7].

Seeds

Draw

References

External Links
 Main Draw

2015 MD
2015 ATP Challenger Tour